Arthur Elliot or Elliott may refer to: 

Arthur Elliot (artist) (1809–1892), British artist
Arthur Elliot (politician) (1846–1923), Scottish Liberal Unionist politician
Arthur Elliott (photographer) (1870–1938), South African photographer
Arthur G. Elliott Jr. (1916–2003), American politician from the state of Michigan
Arthur Elliott (footballer) (1870–?), English footballer
Arthur J. Elliot II (1933–1968), American naval officer